The following lists events that happened during 1873 in New Zealand.

Incumbents

Regal and viceregal
Head of State — Queen Victoria
Governor — Sir George Ferguson Bowen is transferred, on 19 March, to Australia to become Governor of Victoria. His replacement, The Rt. Hon Sir James Fergusson, takes up his appointment on 14 June.

Government and law
The 5th New Zealand Parliament continues.

Speaker of the House — Sir Francis Dillon Bell
Premier — William Fox, "caretaker" Premier since the sudden resignation of George Waterhouse on 3 March, steps down in favour of Julius Vogel on the latter's return to New Zealand on 8 April.
Minister of Finance — Julius Vogel
Chief Justice — Hon Sir George Arney

Main centre leaders
Mayor of Auckland — Philip Philips
Mayor of Christchurch — Henry Sawtell followed by Edward B. Bishop
Mayor of Dunedin — Henry Fish
Mayor of Wellington — Joseph Dransfield

Events 
 17 February: The Daily Southern Cross Newspaper prints a hoax report of a Russian invasion of Auckland.
 3 May: The New Zealand Tablet begins publication in Dunedin. The newspaper was published weekly by the Catholic Church until 1996.
 Late August: A cyclone hits the South Island east coast, wrecking several ships.
 December: The Onehunga Branch railway line from Auckland to Onehunga (via Newmarket, Ellerslie, and Penrose) is opened.

Sport

Horse racing

Major race winners
New Zealand Cup: Kakapo
New Zealand Derby: Rapapa

Rugby union
 The Auckland and Thames football clubs adopt rugby union, having previously played association football.
 North Shore rugby club founded.

Shooting
Ballinger Belt: Lieutenant Hoskins (Thames)

Births
17 February: Emily Hancock Siedeberg, New Zealand's first female medical graduate.
21 October (in New South Wales): Bob Semple, politician and unionist.
 9 December (in Ireland): James McCombs, politician
18 December (in Tasmania): Edith Joan Lyttleton, writer.

Unknown date
 Benjamin Sutherland, railway clerk, grocer, businessman and philanthropist
 (in England): Lionel Terry, white supremacist, murderer.

Deaths
 6 or 7 August: Phillip Tapsell mariner, whaler and trader

See also
List of years in New Zealand
Timeline of New Zealand history
History of New Zealand
Military history of New Zealand
Timeline of the New Zealand environment
Timeline of New Zealand's links with Antarctica

References
General
 Romanos, J. (2001) New Zealand Sporting Records and Lists. Auckland: Hodder Moa Beckett. 
Specific

External links